C.A.S.H. is the fourth studio album by rapper Cassidy. It was released on November 16, 2010.

Background
The album was released under NBA superstar Carmelo Anthony's Kross Over Entertainment and E1 Records labels to which Cassidy is signed.

Cassidy recently explained the title of the album in an interview with MTV, also the title is an acronym that stands for 'Cass Always Stays Hard'.

Singles
Promo Singles
"Face 2 Face" was the first promo single and video from the album. A video was released for the single on July 31, 2010.

Official Singles
"Drumma Bass" was the first official single from the album and it was released on September 28, 2010. A video was released for the single on October 14, 2010.

Track listing
The track listing was confirmed by Amazon.com.

Notes
Track 11 - "I'm a G Boy" (featuring AR-AB) has been removed from iTunes for unknown reasons.

Release and promotion

Apply Pressure Mixtapes
In 2009-2010 Cassidy released his mixtape series "Apply Pressure" which was hosted by his CEO Carmelo Anthony. Although the actual album was released November the mixtapes were released in late 2009 and early 2010.

Face 2 Face EP
On August 24, 2010 Cassidy released his first Ep to promote the album Face 2 Face EP containing his promo single "Face 2 Face".

Chart positions

References

2010 albums
Albums produced by Boi-1da
Albums produced by Bink (record producer)
Cassidy (rapper) albums
Albums produced by Vinylz